Diuris behrii, commonly known as golden cowslips, is a species of orchid which is endemic to eastern Australia. It occurs in South Australia, Victoria, New South Wales and the Australian Capital Territory. It has between three and six grass-like leaves and a flowering stem with up to four drooping, yellow flowers with dark streaks on the labellum. The flowers appear between September and November in its native range.

Description
The pedicel of each flower is enclosed in a bract. It has dark streaks similar to those on the labellum. The centre lobe is a broad wedge shape, often with irregular edges. The lateral lobes are small and oblong with toothed edges. Flowering occurs from September to November.

Taxonomy and naming
Diuris behrii was first formally described in 1847 by Diederich Franz Leonhard von Schlechtendal who published his description in Linnaea: ein Journal für die Botanik in ihrem ganzen Umfange, oder Beiträge zur Pflanzenkunde. The specific epithet (behrii) honours the German-American botanist, Hans Hermann Behr.

Distribution and habitat
The golden cowslip orchid grows in grassland and woodland mostly in western Victoria but is also found in south-eastern South Australia and on the slopes and tablelands of New South Wales, including the Australian Capital Territory.

References

behrii
Orchids of New South Wales
Orchids of South Australia
Orchids of Victoria (Australia)
Orchids of the Australian Capital Territory
Endemic orchids of Australia
Flora of New South Wales
Plants described in 1847